Statine is a gamma amino acid that occurs twice in the sequence of pepstatin, a protease inhibitor that is active against pepsin and other acid proteases. It is thought to be responsible for the inhibitory activity of pepstatin because it mimics the tetrahedral transition state of peptide catalysis.

References

Amino acids